Hugues Wembangomo (born 10 May 1992) is a Norwegian former footballer who played as a right back. He has previously played for Sarpsborg 08 and Aalesund, as well as represented Norway at youth international level.

Club career
Wembangomo was born in Kinshasa, Democratic Republic of the Congo, and moved to Østfold in Norway with his family when he was nine years old. During his youth he played for Tveter IL and Borgen IL before he moved to the then second tier team Sarpsborg 08 in late 2008. In 2010, Sarpsborg was promoted to Tippeligaen and on 17 April 2011 he made his debut in Norway's top league when he replaced Berat Jusufi after 70 minutes in the match against Strømsgodset. In total he played 19 matches for Sarpsborg in Tippeligaen in 2011.

Sarpsborg was relegated after the 2011-season, and on 24 February 2012 Wembangomo transferred to Aalesund. In his new club he got a slow start, as he got an injury two days before he signed for Aalesund. When he again was fit from his injury, Aalesund had re-signed the player Wembangomo was supposed to replace on the right back, Enar Jääger.

Two and a half-month after he signed for Aalesund, he made his debut for the first-team against Skarbøvik in the Second Round of the 2012 Norwegian Cup. While Jääger was the first-choice on the right back, Wembangomo played at the left back while Jo Nymo Matland was injured. In the winter of 2014 he sustained an achilles injury, and was let go. After half a year without a club, he was signed by Bærum SK in July 2015. Leaving Bærum after half a season, at the end of the season, he eventually went back to Sunnmøre and IL Hødd. In 2018, he played for Brattvåg IL, eventually captaining the side.

International career
Wembangomo has been capped for Norway several times at youth international level. While he is eligible to play for both Norway and DR Congo, he stated in an interview with Sunnmørsposten in June 2012 that he would choose Norway if he gets the opportunity.

Personal life
He is a brother of Brice Wembangomo.

Career statistics

References

External links

1992 births
Living people
Footballers from Kinshasa
Democratic Republic of the Congo emigrants to Norway
People from Sarpsborg
Norwegian footballers
Sarpsborg 08 FF players
Aalesunds FK players
Eliteserien players
Bærum SK players
Brattvåg IL players
Norwegian Second Division players
Norwegian First Division players
IL Hødd players
Association football defenders